Suad Nasr Abd El Aziz (26 December 1953 – 5 January 2007) was an Egyptian theatre, television, and film actress. She was born in Shubra, Cairo, Egypt. Her fame increased for her role as the character "Maisa", whom she played in the TV series Wanees's Diary, in its first five parts, which began in 1994.

Life

Early life
She was born on December 26, 1953, in Shubra, Cairo, and was aspiring and striving to be a journalist. However, she was destined to join the Higher Institute for Dramatic Arts, from which she graduated in 1975.

Career beginnings
She performed a tragic scene in the story of "Yaseen and Bahia" during her graduation project, which announced her birth as an artist who could professionally perform.

Her first appearance was in the play "The Dabbash Family" by the first one to help her in that world, according to what she said in a press interview, Samir Al-Asfouri, and her first recorded appearance was in 1971 when she participated during her studies in the play "Yassin Weldi", which was directed by her discoverer to comedy Karam Mutawa. He found in her a comedian, contrary to what she thought, that she is only suitable for tragedy.  At the beginning of her career, she participated in several works, including the movie "An Apartment in Wist El-Balad", the TV series "Deserted Beach", and the play "The Lesson Is Over, Stupid" in 1975, so her roles varied between cinema, television and theater, and she had a mark in every way.

Career
In 1982, she made her real breakthrough through her participation in the movie "The Fatal Jealousy" and "An Egyptian Story".  She then rolled her cinematic roles in which the most prominent was her role in the movie "Here Cairo", which placed her in the ranks of comedy stars in Egypt through her simple performance of the Upper-Egyptian woman character who goes with her husband to visit Cairo, whose character was played by artist Mohamed Sobhi. She excelled in the theatre after participating in the play The Barbaric in 1985, and the play The Family of Wanees in 1997. She also participated with him in two of the most successful Arab comedy TV series, namely "Rehlat Al Million" in 1984, and "Wanees's Diaries" with its first five parts that started in 1994, and the role of the character "Maysa", whom she played achieved an unrivaled public success that she mentioned in some press interviews that fans call her "Mama Maysa". She worked again with director Youssef Chahine in the movie Alexandria-New York in 2004, after which she participated in her last work, "Life is the maximum of delight" in 2005.

Death
She underwent a liposuction in a Cairo hospital, and went into a coma that lasted for a year after she was given an anesthetic dose in preparation as a liposuction procedure. Her last words before her death were: "My Lord, if you send my soul into me, then send it pure, and if I die, then make me die with the righteous ones." In a statement attributed to her second husband, the petroleum engineer Muhammad Abdel Moneim, as he stated, according to some newspapers, that she recovered from her coma for about five minutes, and she recommended him to be buried quickly if she died, and that her family would stay for about an hour at her grave to pray for her.  Her daughter, Fayrouz, is said to be a witness to another incident, which is her vision, which is said that she have predicted her death from. Then she died on January 5, 2007, leaving behind a beautiful legacy of work and great love in the hearts of those who loved her.

Filmography
Emraah Bela Qalb 1978 
Al Gheerah Al Katelah 1982 
Khalil Baad El Taadeel 1987 
Haddoutah Masreyyah 1982 
Al Bedayah 1986 
Shakka Fi West Al Balad 1975 
Gawaz Be Karar Gomhoory 2001 
Hona Al Qahera 1985 
Ahlam Aadeyya 2005 
Aly Spicy 2005 
Khareef Aadm2002 
Alexandria-New York 2004 
Life is the maximum of delight 2005

Theatre
 Goz w'Loz
 Al-Hamagy
 Yawmeyat wanis
 Teksab ya Kheisha

Television
 Rihlat Al Melyoun 
 Yawmiat Wanis (the first 5 parts)

References

External links
 
 Suad Nasr on Elcinema.com

1953 births
2007 deaths
Egyptian film actresses
Egyptian comedians
Egyptian stage actresses
Egyptian television actresses
20th-century comedians